Aram Nerow-e Bala (also Romanized as Ārām Nerow-e Bālā; also known as Ārām Nerow) is a village in Chehel Chay Rural District, in the Central District of Minudasht County, Golestan Province, Iran. At the 2006 census, its population was 96, in 27 families.

References 

Populated places in Minudasht County